Jack Burns (1933–2020) was an American comedian and voice actor.

Jack Burns may also refer to:

Jack Burns (American football coach) (born 1949), assistant coach for the Washington Redskins
Jack Burns (Australian footballer) (1918–1995), Australian footballer for Collingwood
Jack Burns (first baseman) (1907–1975), American first baseman, coach, and scout in Major League Baseball
Jack Burns (golfer) (1859–1927), Scottish golfer
Jack Burns (second baseman) (1880–1957), second baseman for the Detroit Tigers
Jack Byrnes, a character in the 2000 film Meet the Parents

See also
John Burns (disambiguation)
Jack Byrne (disambiguation)